Bad Kreuznach station is the largest station in the town of Bad Kreuznach in the German state of Rhineland-Palatinate. The station is classified by Deutsche Bahn as a category 3 station. It is regularly served by Regional-Express and Regionalbahn services on the Nahe Valley Railway (Nahetalbahn). The station is located south-east of the town centre.

History 

The first station in Bad Kreuznach was opened in 1858 with the Nahe Valley Railway and was later used as a freight yard, which is now closed. Between 1896 and 1936, the Kreuznach Light Railways (Kreuznacher Kleinbahnen), a network of 750 mm gauge lines, also terminated at the station. On 1 June 1864 a second station opened in southern Bad Kreuznach called Kreuznach Bad to improve access to the southern part of the city. With the opening of the railway line to Gau-Algesheim in 1902, the present station was built at the junction of two lines between the two stations. The station went into operation in 1905 and the entrance building was built between 1905 and 1908. In due course the other two stations were closed.

Infrastructure

The station is a Keilbahnhof ("wedge-shaped station") with 5 platform tracks. Tracks 1 and 2 are used by trains towards Kaiserslautern and Bingen and tracks 3–5 are used by trains to Mainz / Frankfurt and Saarbrücken. Bad Kreuznach station has an entrance building with a bakery, a newsagent, and a Deutsche Bahn ticket office. The platforms are equipped with seating and food vending machines. Since the summer of 2011, the station has been undergoing a major overhaul after a dispute between the town council and Deutsche Bahn. The platforms are being raised, barrier-free access for the disabled is being built and a new platform canopy will be built.

Passenger services

Bad Kreuznach station is served by the following regional rail services:

Notes

Railway stations in Rhineland-Palatinate
Bad Kreuznach
Railway stations in Germany opened in 1905